Wrightoceras is an extinct genus of cephalopod, belonging to the Ammonite subclass, that lived during the Turonian epoch of the Late Cretaceous.

Distribution 
Fossils of Wrightoceras have been found in Brazil, Colombia (La Frontera Formation), Egypt, Gabon, Mexico, Morocco, Nigeria, Oman, Peru, Tunisia, United States (Texas), and Venezuela.

References

Bibliography 
 

Cretaceous ammonites
Ammonites of Africa
Cretaceous Africa
Ammonites of North America
Cretaceous Mexico
Cretaceous United States
Ammonites of South America
Cretaceous Brazil
Cretaceous Colombia
Cretaceous Peru
Cretaceous Venezuela
Turonian life
Turonian genus first appearances
Turonian genus extinctions
Fossil taxa described in 1954